Operation Enterprise (OE) is a high school and college student program sponsored by the American Management Association.

History
Established in 1963, OE is a leadership training and career development program held on college campuses around the country, typically during June and July. It is designed to teach the necessary skills to succeed in business. The intensive, eight-day residential experience focuses on management, negotiation, conflict resolution, strategic planning and ethics, and improves the student's leadership, communication and presentation skills.

Since its inception, more than 10,000 students have participated in OE.

External links
Operation Enterprise Website
Operation Enterprise In Malaysia
Growing A Successful Business

Business education